Henton may refer to:

Henton (surname)
Henton, Oxfordshire in Chinnor civil parish, Oxfordshire, England
Henton in Wookey civil parish, Somerset, England